is a railway station in Miyazaki City, Miyazaki Prefecture, Japan.

Lines

Layout 
The station consists of an island platform serving two tracks at grade with a siding. The station building is a wooden structure in western style with a stained glass gable. It houses a staffed ticket window and a waiting area. Access to the island platform is by means of a footbridge.

Management of the passenger facilities at the station has been outsourced to the JR Kyushu Tetsudou Eigyou Co., a wholly owned subsidiary of JR Kyushu specialising in station services. It staffs the ticket booth which is equipped with a POS machine but does not have a Midori no Madoguchi facility.

Adjacent stations

History
On 15 December 1913, the  opened a line from  northwards to Hirose (now closed). This station, then named  was opened on the same day as an intermediate station on the track. Expanding north of Takanabe in phases, the track eventually reached  and the entire stretch from Kokura to Miyakonojō was redesignated as the Nippō Main Line on 15 December 1923. Jirogabyū was renamed Hyūga-Sumiyoshi on 1 October 1935. With the privatization of Japanese National Railways (JNR), the successor of JGR, on 1 April 1987, the station came under the control of JR Kyushu.

Passenger statistics
In fiscal 2016, the station was used by an average of 858 passengers daily (boarding passengers only), and it ranked 183rd among the busiest stations of JR Kyushu.

See also
List of railway stations in Japan

References

External links

Hyūga-Sumiyoshi (JR Kyushu)

Railway stations in Miyazaki Prefecture
Railway stations in Japan opened in 1913